Belisarius is a genus of scorpions belonging to the family Belisariidae. The species of this genus are found in Southern Europe.

Species
There are two species:
Belisarius ibericus 
Belisarius xambeui

References

Scorpion genera
Taxa named by Eugène Simon